Dragi Ivković (born 6 March 1948), also credited as Dragan Ivković and known by his nickname Tvigi, is a Serbian retired professional basketball player.

Playing career 
Ivković was a member of Radnički Belgrade teams that won the Yugoslav League in the 1972–73 season and the Yugoslav Cup in 1976. He played in the 1977 FIBA European Cup Winners' Cup final.

National team career 
Ivković was a member of the Yugoslavia national team that won the gold medal at the 1971 Mediterranean Games in Turkey.

He was a member of the national team that won the gold medal at the 1973 FIBA European Championship in Spain. Over four tournament games, he averaged 6.7 points per game.

References

External links 
 Sportski spomenar at RTS

1948 births
Living people
Basketball players from Belgrade
Competitors at the 1971 Mediterranean Games
BKK Radnički players
Mediterranean Games gold medalists for Yugoslavia
Point guards
Serbian men's basketball players
Shooting guards
Yugoslav men's basketball players
Mediterranean Games medalists in basketball